Volcán Atitlán is a large, conical, active stratovolcano adjacent to the caldera of Lake Atitlán in the Guatemalan Highlands of the Sierra Madre de Chiapas range. It is within the Sololá Department, southwestern Guatemala.

The volcano has been quite active historically, with more than a dozen eruptions recorded between 1469 and 1853, the date of its most recent eruption. Atitlán is part of the Central American Volcanic Arc. The arc is a chain of volcanoes stretching along Central America formed by subduction of the Cocos Plate underneath the Caribbean Plate. These volcanoes are part of the Ring of Fire around the Pacific Ocean.

Volcán Atitlán is few miles south of Volcán Tolimán, which rises from the southern shore of Lake Atitlán. Volcán San Pedro rises above Lake Atitlán northwest of Volcán Atitlán. A long narrow bay separates Volcán Atitlán and Volcán Toliman from Volcán San Pedro.

Wildlife 
Atitlán is home to two particularly rare and beautiful birds that are endemic to the cloud forests of this region. The horned guan (Oreophasis derbianus) is a Pleistocene relic of the family Cracidae that persists today only in small fragments of its previous range. This bird is the size of a turkey and the adult male has a one-inch scarlet-colored "horn" projecting straight up from the top of its head. The Cabanis's or azure-rumped tanager (Tangara cabanisi) is probably the most restricted-range species in the region. It occurs only at mid-elevations within the Sierra Madre del Sur of Chiapas, Mexico and western Guatemala.

References 
 
 VolcanoWorld information

See also
 List of volcanoes in Guatemala

Atitlan
Volcan Atitlan
Atitlan
Stratovolcanoes of Guatemala
Subduction volcanoes
Volcan Atitlan
Volcan Atitlan
Pleistocene stratovolcanoes
Holocene stratovolcanoes